Paraba is a genus of land planarians from South America.

Description 
Species of the genus Paraba have a slender body with nearly parallel margins while creeping. The largest specimens may reach about 8 cm in length. The copulatory apparatus has a permanent conical penis occupying the entire male cavity and the female cavity is rounded and filled with a multilayered epithelium.

Etymology 
Paraba means multicolored in the Tupi language and alludes to the name of the type-species, Paraba multicolor.

Species 
The following species are recognised in the genus Paraba:

Paraba aurantia 
Paraba bresslaui 
Paraba caapora 
Paraba cassula 
Paraba franciscana 
Paraba gaucha 
Paraba goettei 
Paraba iguassuensis 
Paraba incognita 
Paraba multicolor 
Paraba phocaica 
Paraba piriana 
Paraba preta 
Paraba tingauna 
Paraba rubidolineata 
Paraba smaragdina 
Paraba suva 
Paraba tapira 
Paraba tata 
Paraba tingauna

References 

Geoplanidae
Rhabditophora genera